Lawrence William Osborne (born 20 October 1967) is an English former professional footballer who played in the Football League for Maidstone United, Newport County and Gillingham.

References

1967 births
Living people
People from West Ham
English footballers
Association football midfielders
Arsenal F.C. players
Newport County A.F.C. players
Wycombe Wanderers F.C. players
Redbridge Forest F.C. players
Maidstone United F.C. (1897) players
Gillingham F.C. players
English Football League players